The Beckenbach Book Prize, formerly known as the Mathematical Association of America Book Prize, is awarded to authors of distinguished, innovative books that have been published by the Mathematical Association of America (MAA). The prize was established in 1983 and first awarded in 1985.  The award is $2500 for the honored author and is awarded on an irregular basis.

Recipients 
The recipients of the Beckenbach Book Prize and their books are:

 1985: Charles Robert Hadlock, Field Theory and Its Classical Problems
 1986: Edward W. Packel, The Mathematics of Games and Gambling
 1989: Thomas M. Thompson, From Error-Correcting Codes through Sphere Packings to Simple Groups
 1994: Steven G. Krantz, Complex Analysis: The Geometric Viewpoint
 1996: Constance Reid, The Search for E.T. Bell, Also Known as John Taine
 1998: Sandor Szabo and Sherman K. Stein, Algebra and Tiling: Homomorphisms in the Service of Geometry
 1999: David M. Bressoud, Proofs and Confirmations: The Story of the Alternating Sign Matrix Conjecture
 2002: Joseph Kirtland, Identification Numbers and Check Digits Schemes
 2004: James Tanton, Solve This: Math Activities for Students and Clubs
 2006: Arthur Benjamin and Jennifer Quinn, Proofs That Really Count: the Art of Combinatorial Proof
 2007: William P. Berlinghoff and Fernando Q. Gouvêa, Math through the Ages: A Gentle History for Teachers and Others
 2008: William Dunham, Euler: The Master of Us All
 2012: Dan Kalman, Uncommon Mathematical Excursions: Polynomia and Related Realm
 2012: Nathan Carter, Visual Group Theory
 2014: Judith Grabiner, A Historian Looks Back: The Calculus as Algebra and Selected Writings
 2015: Seth Braver, Lobachevski Illuminated
 2017: Tim Chartier, When Life is Linear: From Computer Graphics to Bracketology
 2018: Roland van der Veen and Jan van de Craats, The Riemann Hypothesis: A Million Dollar Problem
 2021: Nathan Carter, Introduction to the Mathematics of Computer Graphics

See also
 Euler Book Prize
 List of mathematics awards

References 

Awards of the Mathematical Association of America